The city of Ottawa, Canada held municipal elections on November 14, 1988.

Mayor Jim Durrell was re-elected with little opposition. Rideau Street businessman Michael Bartholomew finished 2nd with just 6% of the vote. Due to the lack of competition, only about one third of the electorate participated in the election.

Mayor

City council

The composition of Ottawa's city council was more left leaning than the previous council due to the defeat of Durrell-ally Bob Morrison in Carleton Ward and the election of New Democratic Party backed candidates Lynn Smyth and Michael Jannigan. Jannigan, who was declared elected on election night had to wait over a year to take his seat however, as a recount gave his opponent the win, but after the case was taken to court, a special election was held in 1989 which Jannigan won. 

* Results after a recount.

 

* Results after a recount.

Special election
The election day results in Dalhousie Ward showed Michael Janigan ahead by 12 votes over Peter Harris, but this was done in error. A recount gave Harris a 2 vote win, but Janigan took the results to court, so the city held a special election on November 20, 1989 to resolve the matter, which Janigan won. Harris served as alderman in the interim. The race was a proxy battle for federal politics, with Janigan being supported by the NDP and Harris by the Liberals. The fringe candidates were backed by parties too, the Greens backed Dan Roy and the Rhinoceros Party backed Dale Alkerton

Ottawa Board of Education Trustees

References
Ottawa Citizen, November 15, 1988

Municipal elections in Ottawa
Municipal election, 1988
Ottawa municipal election